Juliano Fiori (born June 27, 1985) is a rugby sevens player. Born in England, he represented  at the 2016 Summer Olympics. His father is Brazilian and migrated to England in the seventies due to political upheaval.

References

External links 
 

1985 births
Living people
Male rugby sevens players
Brazilian rugby union players
Olympic rugby sevens players of Brazil
Brazil international rugby sevens players
Rugby sevens players at the 2016 Summer Olympics
Richmond F.C. players
Rugby union players from London
Brazilian rugby sevens players
English rugby sevens players
English rugby union players
Rugby union players from Hammersmith
Rugby union players from Ealing
Rugby union flankers
Cambridge University R.U.F.C. players
Rugby union number eights
London Welsh RFC players
English people of Brazilian descent